Stafford Common railway station was a former British railway station on the outskirts of Stafford.

It was opened by the Stafford and Uttoxeter Railway in 1874 about seven years after the line opened. There was a single platform with a stationmaster's office and waiting room, but it included a goods yard and an engine shed. It became the headquarters of the line, to reduce dependence on the LNWR at Stafford station.

The Stafford and Uttoxeter Railway was purchased for £100,000 by the Great Northern Railway in July 1881 and the line subsequently passed into LNER ownership with Railway Grouping in 1923.

The original station was to the southwest of the Marston Road bridge (now Common Road). When the GNR doubled the line, the station was rebuilt on the other side of the bridge and bordering on Aston Terrace. It had two platforms and opened in 1882. The station buildings were on the bridge, timber throughout, with covered steps to the platforms where there were small shelters.

Passenger services finished in 1939, though it remained open as Stafford Common Air Ministry Sidings until 1952. Both of the station's platforms remain in situ, albeit under vegetation, and the line through the station has been converted into a public footpath.

From there the line climbed steeply at 1 in 70 before falling at 1 in 75 to Salt and Sandon.

Route

References

Further reading

Disused railway stations in Staffordshire
Former Great Northern Railway stations
Railway stations in Great Britain opened in 1874
Railway stations in Great Britain closed in 1939
Buildings and structures in Stafford